Bæjarhreppur is a former municipality in Iceland.

According to the 2011 census, it had a population of 100 inhabitants.

References

Former municipalities of Iceland